Monti Tiburtini is a station on Line B of the Rome Metro. It is located on Via dei Monti Tiburtini, at the junction with Via Filippo Meda. To make room for its construction, in the early 1980s, some tennis courts and a football field of a nearby sports centre were demolished. It opened on 8 December 1990. Nearby are the Ospedale Sandro Pertini and bus stops for services 61, 449, 542, 544, 548 and n2.

References

External links

Rome Metro Line B stations
Railway stations opened in 1990
1990 establishments in Italy
Rome Q. XXI Pietralata
Railway stations in Italy opened in the 20th century